Karashokat is a village in the Shalkar District, Aktobe Region, Kazakhstan.  It is part of the Kishikum Rural District (KATO code - 156442300). Population:

Geography
The village is located near the northern end of the Lesser Barsuki Desert.

References

Populated places in Aktobe Region